Gaudryella is an extinct genus of prehistoric bony fish that lived during the Cenomanian.

References

Late Cretaceous fish
Cretaceous fish of Europe
Prehistoric bony fish genera